Aleksander Rokosa (17 July 1936 – 25 July 2000) was a Polish gymnast. He competed at the 1960 Summer Olympics, the 1964 Summer Olympics and the 1968 Summer Olympics.

References

1936 births
2000 deaths
Polish male artistic gymnasts
Olympic gymnasts of Poland
Gymnasts at the 1960 Summer Olympics
Gymnasts at the 1964 Summer Olympics
Gymnasts at the 1968 Summer Olympics
People from Brzeziny
Sportspeople from Łódź Voivodeship